Chandra Mohan (born Mallampalli Chandrasekhara Rao; 23 May 1937) is a former Indian actor known for his works predominantly in Telugu films. He has garnered one Filmfare Award South and two Nandi Awards. He received critical reception for his performance in box office hits such as Rangula Ratnam (1966) for which he received the state Nandi Award for Best Actor, Padaharella Vayasu (1978) for which he won the Filmfare Best Actor Award (Telugu), and Siri Siri Muvva (1978). His first Tamil film was Naalai Namadhe (1975). Some of the films in which he starred as the lead actor are Seetamalakshmi (1978), Ram Robert Rahim (1980), Radha Kalyanam (1981), Rendu Rellu Aaru (1986), and Chandamama Raave (1987).

Early life
Chandra Mohan was born as Mallampalli Chandrasekhara Rao on 23 May 1937, in Pamidimukkala village in Krishna district of Andhra Pradesh. He did his schooling in Y.V.R.M.Z.P. High School at Meduru. He graduated from the agriculture college of Bapatla. He has a brother named Chinnayya and an elder sister named Satyavathi. He is the cousin of veteran filmmaker K. Viswanath.

Early career
Chandra Mohan was introduced to the Telugu film industry through the film Rangula Ratnam in 1966. In 1968, he starred in Sukha Duhkalu, as the caring brother of Vanisri, for which he received awards.

Awards
Nandi Awards
 Best Male Comedian - Chandamama Raave (1987)
 Best Character Actor – Athanokkade (2005)

Filmfare Awards South
Best Award - Telugu – Padaharella Vayasu (1978)

Selected filmography

Films

Unreleased films

Television
 Gangato Rambabu - Zee Telugu as Kameshwara Shastri

References

External links
 

Telugu male actors
Telugu comedians
Living people
Filmfare Awards South winners
Nandi Award winners
People from Krishna district
Male actors from Andhra Pradesh
Indian male film actors
Male actors in Telugu cinema
Male actors in Tamil cinema
20th-century Indian male actors
21st-century Indian male actors
1945 births